This is a list of members of the Tory government of the United Kingdom in office under the leadership of the Duke of Portland from 1807 to 1809.

Members of the Cabinet are in bold face.

References
 Chris Cook and John Stevenson, British Historical Facts 1760–1830
 Joseph Haydn and Horace Ockerby, The Book of Dignities
Notes

1807 establishments in the United Kingdom
1809 disestablishments in the United Kingdom
1800s in the United Kingdom
British ministries
Ministries of George III of the United Kingdom
Cabinets established in 1807
Cabinets disestablished in 1809